Isopogon fletcheri, commonly known as Fletcher's drumsticks, is a species of plant in the family Proteaceae and is endemic to a restricted area in the Blue Mountains of New South Wales. It is a bushy shrub with narrow egg-shaped to narrow lance-shaped leaves with the narrower end towards the base, and top-shaped to egg-shaped heads of yellowish or creamy green flowers.

Description

Taxonomy and naming
Isopogon fletcheri was first formally described in 1894 by Ferdinand von Mueller in Proceedings of the Linnean Society of New South Wales Series from specimens collected by Joseph James Fletcher from Blackheath, overlooking the Grose Valley.

Distribution and habitat
Fletcher's drumsticks grows in forest within the spray zone of waterfalls near sandstone cliffs in a few places near Blackheath.

Conservation status
This isopogon is classified as "vulnerable" under the Australian Government Environment Protection and Biodiversity Conservation Act 1999 and the New South Wales Government Biodiversity Conservation Act 2016. The main threats to the species include its small population size, restricted distribution, disease caused by Phytophthora cinnamomi, disturbance due to walkers and rock climbers, and weed invasion.

Use in horticulture
This species is hardy when grown in well-drained soil, using low-phosphorus fertilisers.

References

fletcheri
Flora of New South Wales
Taxa named by Ferdinand von Mueller
Plants described in 1894